Tathātā (Sanskrit: तथाता; Pali: tathatā) is a Buddhist term variously translated as "thusness" or "suchness," referring to the nature of reality free from conceptual elaborations and the subject–object distinction. While also used in Theravada, it is a significant concept in Mahayana Buddhism.

The Buddha
The Buddha referred to himself as the Tathāgata, which can mean either "One who has thus come" or "One who has thus gone", and can also be interpreted as "One who has arrived at suchness".

Theravada Buddhism
In Theravada, this term designates the nature of existence (bhāva), the truth which applies to things. According to the Kathavatthu, tathātā is not an unconditioned or un-constructed (asankhata) phenomenon. The only phenomena which is un-constructed in Theravada is Nibbana.

According to Buddhadasa Bhikkhu, tathātā is merely the way things are, the truth of all things: "When tathātā is seen, the three characteristics of anicca [impermanence], dukkha [suffering], and anatta [not-self] are seen, sunnata [emptiness] is seen, and idappaccayata [specific conditionality] is seen. Tathātā is the summary of them all -- merely thus, only thus, not-otherness."

Mahayana Buddhism 
Tathatā in the East Asian Mahayana tradition is seen as representing the base reality and can be used to terminate the use of words. A 5th-century Chinese Mahayana scripture entitled Awakening of Faith in the Mahayana describes the concept more fully:

R. H. Robinson, echoing D. T. Suzuki, conveys how the Laṅkāvatāra Sūtra perceives dharmata through the portal of śūnyatā: "The Laṅkāvatāra is  always   careful   to   balance Śūnyatā with Tathatā, or to insist that when the world is viewed as śūnya, empty, it is grasped  in its  suchness."

See also 
Ten suchnesses
Reality in Buddhism
Dharmadhatu
Ziran (Daoism)
Tattva (Hinduism)
Haecceity (from Latin, "this-ness")
Quiddity (from Latin, "what-ness")

References

Sources

 

Buddhist philosophical concepts